Vipa Bernhardt (born 20 September 1982) is a German former competitive swimmer who specialized in breaststroke events. She was a member of the swimming team for Schwimmgemeinschaft Frankfurt. Bernhardt was also a college swimmer for the Florida Gators swimming and diving team under head coach Gregg Troy at the University of Florida in Gainesville, Florida.

Bernhardt qualified for the women's 100-meter breaststroke at the 2004 Summer Olympics in Athens, Greece, by attaining an A-standard entry time of 1:09.04 at the German Olympic trials. Bernhardt failed to advance to the Olympic final, and she placed thirteenth overall in the semifinal, with a time of 1:09.72.

Bernhardt graduated from the University of Florida with a Bachelor of Science degree major in neurobiology and a Bachelor of Arts degree major in music performance, as well as a Ph.D. in biomedical sciences.

References

External links
Profile – German Swimming Federation 
NBC 2008 Olympics profile

1982 births
Living people
German female swimmers
Olympic swimmers of Germany
Swimmers at the 2004 Summer Olympics
German female breaststroke swimmers
Sportspeople from Riyadh
Florida Gators women's swimmers